Caryl is both a unisex given name and surname. As a given name, it is an alternate form of Carol that is common for women and Carroll that is uncommon for men. It is also an uncommon surname.

Given name
 Caryl Bagot, 6th Baron Bagot (1877–1961), Irish Guards officer
 Caryl Brahms (1901-1982), pseudonym of English writer Doris Caroline Abrahams (1901–1982)
 Caryl Chessman (1921–1960), convicted robber and rapist
 Caryl Churchill (born 1938), English playwright
 Caryl Parry Jones (born 1958), Welsh singer
 Caryl Kristensen (born 1960), American comedian, sitcom actor and daytime talk show host
 Caryl Parker Haskins (1908–2001), American scientist, author, inventor and philanthropist
 Caryl Phillips (born 1958), Kittitian-British writer
 Caryl Righetti (born 1984), Swiss footballer
 Caryl Thomas (born 1986), Welsh rugby union player

Surname
 Joseph Caryl (1602-1673), English theologian
 Ronnie Caryl (born 1953), English guitarist

See also

 Caral
 Carel
 Carell
 Caril
 Carol (disambiguation)
 Caroll
 Caryll

Notes

Unisex given names

de:Caryl